This is a list of present equipment used by the Indian Army.

Individual equipment

Infantry weapons

Knives and Bayonets

Small arms

Explosives

Vehicles

Armoured combat vehicles

Utility and staff transport

Goods and field transport vehicles

Engineering and support vehicles

Unmanned ground vehicle

Artillery

Air Defence

Missile systems

Anti-tank guided missiles

Ballistic and cruise missiles

Aircraft

Unmanned Aerial Vehicle

Vessels

Radar

Future procurements

Vehicles
Future Ready Combat Vehicle (FRCV)- up to 1770 in number to replace the T-72 MBT. The tanks would have 120/125mm smooth bore gun, be in medium weight class (50 tonnes) with a crew of 3/4 personnel.

Future Infantry Combat Vehicle (FICV)- up to 1750 in number to replace the older BMP-2 Sarath

Artillery systems
Under the Field Artillery Rationalization Plan, Indian Army plans to procure around 3000 155 mm towed, wheeled and tracked artillery systems. The requirement for artillery guns to be met with indigenous development and production. Production of crucial bi-modular charge system will be started soon at Nalanda ordnance factory. HEMRL, a DRDO lab has developed the technology indigenously.
 State-run Ordnance Factory Board (OFB) will deliver two types of indigenously developed 155mm howitzers to the Indian Army based on the FH77B howitzer purchased way back in 1986. One version will be 155/39 calibre while the other will be 155/45 calibre. Trials are to be completed by June 2013
 Government is also evaluating 155mm/52 self-propelled howitzers wherein three Indian vendors, including two private sector companies, have been selected for trials of their equipment.

Infantry equipment

 Sniper Rifles - 5000 new sniper rifles in .338 Lapua Magnum to be procured to replace old Dragunov SVD.
 Anti-materiel rifles - 1000 new anti materiel rifles are to be acquired for which global RFI's have been issued by the MOD.
Ballistic helmet - The Indian Government has approved procurement of 170,000 (1.7 Lakh) ballistic helmets.
Bullet-resistant vest - The Ministry of Defence has ordered about 186,138 (1.86 Lakh) bulletproof vests on 9 April 2018. These will be manufactured in India by SMPP Pvt Ltd. This is in addition to the 50,000 vests ordered in 2016 under emergency procurement.

Aviation
 HAL Light Combat Helicopter - HAL has obtained a firm order to deliver 114 HAL LCH to the Indian Army.
 HAL Light Utility Helicopter: The Indian army has projected a requirement for up to 197 light helicopters to replace its aging fleet of Chetaks and Cheetahs. The Indian Army chose Eurocopter Fennec under a US$550 million contract in the summer of 2007. Under this contract, 60 helicopters were to be supplied from Eurocopter in fly-away condition and the rest were to be assembled by HAL in India. This order was later scrapped due to allegations of unfair field trials from one of the competing company, Bell Helicopters. A fresh tender process was initiated later in which Eurocopter Fennec and Kamov Ka-226 were shortlisted for user trials. Trials were completed and Kamov Ka-226 was declared the winner and about 200 helicopters are to be made in India under the "Make in India" initiative, Indian Army has planned to replace obsolete Chetaks and Cheetahs with it, until the arrival of HAL LUH, as the later would be ready for its first flight only by 2017.

Field firing ranges

This is a list of Indian military's field firing ranges used for testing the weapons, training the troops and wargaming.

 Mahe Field Firing Range (MFFR), Ladakh. 

 Mahajan Field Firing Range, on NH-62 halfway between Suratgarh & Bikaner, Rajasthan.

 Hisar Field Firing Range, on MDR-108 between Kanwari &Badya Jattan in Hisar district, Haryana.

See also
 Currently active military equipment by country
 List of regiments of the Indian Army
 Women in Indian Armed Forces

References



Indian Army
Military equipment of India
Indian Army
Equipment